Bertul Kocabaş (born 15 February 1992) is a footballer who plays for Sarıyer. He made his Süper Lig debut against Antalyaspor on 21 September 2012. Born in Germany, he represented Turkey at under-21 international level.

References

External links
 Bertul Kocabaş at TFF.org
 

1992 births
Living people
Sportspeople from Hamm
Turkish footballers
German footballers
Turkey under-21 international footballers
Kardemir Karabükspor footballers
Eskişehirspor footballers
Süper Lig players
Association football forwards
2. Bundesliga players
Footballers from North Rhine-Westphalia
Hamburger SV II players
Rot-Weiß Oberhausen players
Sarıyer S.K. footballers
Rot Weiss Ahlen players